The Aubrey Peak Wilderness is a  wilderness administered by the Bureau of Land Management (BLM). The wilderness is located in northwest Arizona in the southwest of Mohave County, a region of the southeastern Mojave Desert's extension into northwest Arizona.

The wilderness is one of two in the Rawhide Mountains, which border the north bank of the west-flowing Bill Williams River. The other wilderness is on both sides of the river, the Rawhide Mountains Wilderness; the section south of the river is in the northeast of the Buckskin Mountains, and the southeast of the Rawhides. The Buckskin Wilderness is on the western border of Alamo Lake, of Alamo Lake State Park.

The confluence has the following sites:

Bill Williams National Wildlife Preserve
Buckskin Mountain State Park
Cattail Cove State Park
Parker Dam

Peaks of the wilderness

See also
 List of LCRV Wilderness Areas (Colorado River)
 List of Arizona Wilderness Areas

References

External links
 Aubrey Peak Wilderness, wilderness.net
 Aubrey Peak Wilderness, blm.gov

Protected areas of Mohave County, Arizona
Wilderness areas within the Lower Colorado River Valley
Wilderness areas of Arizona
Protected areas of the Mojave Desert
Bureau of Land Management areas in Arizona